John Bradshaw (by 1519 – May 1588), of Presteigne, Radnorshire and St Dogmaels, Pembrokeshire, was an English-Welsh politician.

Family
Bradshaw was the eldest son of MP for Ludlow, John Bradshaw. By 1539, Bradshaw had married Margaret née Vaughan, a daughter of Roger Vaughan of Clyro, Radnorshire. They had one son, James, who predeceased him, leaving Bradshaw's grandson, also named John, as his heir. His second wife was Elizabeth née Gerard, a daughter of William Gerard of Chester, Cheshire, and who represented Chester as MP. Bradshaw and Elizabeth had six sons.

Career
He was a Member (MP) of the Parliament of England for Radnorshire in April 1554.

References

1588 deaths
16th-century Welsh politicians
People from Pembrokeshire
People from Presteigne
English MPs 1554
Year of birth uncertain